Marin Spânu (born 19 November 1973) is a retired Moldovan football midfielder.

References

1973 births
Living people
Moldovan footballers
CSF Bălți players
FC Zimbru Chișinău players
FC Lokomotiv Nizhny Novgorod players
Maccabi Kafr Kanna F.C. players
Association football midfielders
Moldovan expatriate footballers
Expatriate footballers in Russia
Moldovan expatriate sportspeople in Russia
Expatriate footballers in Israel
Moldovan expatriate sportspeople in Israel
Expatriate footballers in Kazakhstan
Moldovan expatriate sportspeople in Kazakhstan
Moldova international footballers